Nicoloso da Recco was one of a dozen s built for the  (Royal Italian Navy) in 1930. Named after the Italian Renaissance seaman Nicoloso da Recco, she served during World War II in which she was the sole survivor of her destroyer class. She shot down three Beaufort bombers while escorting a two-freighter convoy on 21 June 1942 off Tunisia. On 2 December 1942 Nicoloso Da Recco took part of the Battle of Skerki Bank, where an Italo-German convoy carrying troops and supplies to Libya was obliterated by Allied naval forces. Nicoloso Da Recco was the only vessel of her class to survive the war, and was eventually scrapped in July 1954.

Design and description
Their complement during wartime was 222–225 officers and enlisted men.

Nicoloso da Recco was powered by two Tosi geared steam turbines, each driving one propeller shaft using steam supplied by four Odero water-tube boilers.

Their main battery consisted of six  guns in three twin-gun turrets, one each fore and aft of the superstructure and the third amidships. Anti-aircraft (AA) defense for the Navigatori-class ships was provided by a pair of  AA guns in single mounts abreast the forward funnel and a pair of twin-gun mounts for  machine guns. They were equipped with six  torpedo tubes in two triple mounts amidships. Unlike her sister ships, Nicoloso da Recco was unable to carry any mines because her aft superstructure had been enlarged to accommodate an admiral and his staff.

Construction and career
Nicoloso da Recco was laid down by Cantieri Navali Riuniti at their Ancona shipyard on 14 December 1927, launched on 5 January 1930 and commissioned on 20 May.

Footnotes

Bibliography

External links
 Nicoloso da Recco Marina Militare website

Navigatori-class destroyers
Ships built in Ancona
Ships built by Cantieri Navali del Tirreno e Riuniti
1930 ships
World War II destroyers of Italy